László Szalma (born 27 October 1957) is a retired Hungarian long jumper. He won six medals at the European Indoor Championships—two gold, three silver and one bronze—and finished fourth at the 1980 Olympic Games and the 1983 World Championships. His career best jump of 8.30 metres, achieved in July 1985 in Budapest, is the current Hungarian record.

Career
He was born in Nagymaros. He won a Hungarian title for the first time in 1977, taking the national indoor championship, and first made his mark in international athletics at the 1977 European Indoor Championships. With a jump of 7.78 metres he won the bronze medal. At the 1978 European Indoor Championships the next year he won the gold medal with a jump of 7.83 metres. In 1980 he competed at the Olympic Games in Moscow, finishing fourth. Then, despite jumping even better at the 1981 European Indoor Championships, Szalma only finished fourth with 7.90 metres, eleven centimetres behind the winner Rolf Bernhard. In the summer he won the gold medal at the 1981 Summer Universiade. At the 1982 European Indoor Championships, there was an eleven centimetre gap between first and seventh place; Szalma finished in between at a fifth place. At the 1982 European Championships he dropped slightly to an eleventh place.

In 1983 Szalma competed at the inaugural World Championships. He leapt 7.97 metres to progress from the qualifying round, and finished fourth in the final with 8.12 metres. He missed the 1984 Summer Olympics due to the Soviet-led 1984 Summer Olympics boycott, but repeated the fourth place at the 1985 World Indoor Games. During the 1984–85 indoor season he also won the silver medal at the European Indoor Championships. It was a very tight competition, with Szalma tying the winner, his compatriot Gyula Pálóczi, on 8.15 metres but with Pálóczi winning on countback. Also, Szalma was one centimetre ahead of bronze medalist Sergey Layevskiy and two centimetres ahead of fourth placer Ján Leitner. In the summer he jumped a career best of 8.30 metres, in July in Budapest. The result is the Hungarian record, and also the best result in Europe that year. At the end of the season he finished third at the 1985 World Cup, tying with but losing to Robert Emmiyan at 8.09 metres.

At the 1986 European Indoor Championships  Szalma won his second silver medal in a row, but this time with a jump of 8.24 metres, which was a career best on the indoor track. In 1987 there were two indoor championships, with Szalma finishing fourth at the European and sixth at the 1987 World Indoor Championships. In 1988 he won his last silver medal at the European Indoor Championships, finishing three centimetres behind Frans Maas and three ahead of Giovanni Evangelisti. In the summer he competed at the 1988 Olympic Games, finishing sixth both in the qualifying round and in the final. In 1989 he finished fourth at both the European and the 1989 World Indoor Championships.

At his final European Indoor Championships in 1990, Szalma only managed a fifteenth place. At his third Olympic participation, two years later, he did not manage to reach the final of the long jump competition.

He became the Hungarian long jump champion in 1978, 1980, 1981, 1982, 1983, 1985 and 1988, rivalling with Béla Bakosi, Gyula Pálóczi, Zsolt Szabó and Csaba Almási. He also became Hungarian indoor champion in the years 1977 through 1990, except for one year, as Gyula Pálóczi won in 1985.

International competitions

1Representing Europe

References

External links 
 

1957 births
Living people
Hungarian male long jumpers
Athletes (track and field) at the 1980 Summer Olympics
Athletes (track and field) at the 1988 Summer Olympics
Athletes (track and field) at the 1992 Summer Olympics
Olympic athletes of Hungary
People from Nagymaros
World Athletics Championships athletes for Hungary
Universiade medalists in athletics (track and field)
Universiade gold medalists for Hungary
Medalists at the 1981 Summer Universiade
Sportspeople from Pest County
20th-century Hungarian people
21st-century Hungarian people